The Mauritius women's national football team is the first women's association football team that represents the country of Mauritius. They are controlled by the Mauritius Football Association and are members of FIFA, the Confederation of African Football (CAF), and the Council of Southern Africa Football Associations (COSAFA). The development of women's football in the country and in Africa as a whole faces a number of challenges, with a programme for women's football not being created in the country until 1997. FIFA gives money to the Mauritius Football Association, 10% of which is aimed at developing football in the country in areas that include women's football, sport medicine and futsal.

History
In 1985, very few countries had a women's national football team and Mauritius was no exception, with a women's football programme only being established in the country in 1997. Their first match was against Réunion on 3 June 2012 in Saint-Denis.  This match ended in a 3–0 defeat.  A return match was planned for July 2012 in Mauritius, but this was put back to November 2012.  The match was played in Bambous on 25 November 2012, with Réunion winning again, this time by 2 goals to 1.

Mauritius was scheduled to take part in several competitions, which they ended up withdrawing from before playing a single match. The list includes the 2002 Council of Southern Africa Football Associations (COSAFA) women's tournament in Harare, Zimbabwe from which they withdrew. In 2005, Zambia was supposed to host a regional COSAFA women's football tournament, with several countries agreeing to send teams including South Africa, Zimbabwe, Mozambique, Malawi, Seychelles, Mauritius, Madagascar, Zambia, Botswana, Namibia, Lesotho and Swaziland. The tournament eventually took place in 2006, but Mauritius did not send a team. Beyond that, they were scheduled to participate in the 2008 Women's U-20 World Cup qualification, where they were scheduled to play Zimbabwe in the preliminary round; however, Zimbabwe withdrew from the competition giving Mauritius an automatic bye into the first round. In that round Mauritius was supposed to play South Africa, but withdrew from the competition.

They took part in the 2019 COSAFA Women's Championship, losing all three matches in their group.

, the head coach was Alain Jules. As of March 2012, the team was not ranked in the world by FIFA, as it had not yet participated in any matches against other FIFA members. By June 2020, they were bottom of the FIFA rankings.

Recruitment and organisation
Women's football in Africa as a whole faces several challenges, including limited access to education, poverty amongst women in the wider society, and fundamental gender inequality present in the society that occasionally allows for female specific human rights abuses. Another problem with the development for the national team, one faced throughout the continent, is if quality female football players are found, many leave the country seeking greater opportunity in Northern Europe or the United States.

Women's football was formally established in Mauritius in 1997.  As of 2009, there was no national or regional women's competition but a school competition existed.  There are 17 clubs for women over the age of 16 and four youth clubs in the country.  The country has three national women's football teams: senior, under-15, and under-19. In the period between 2002 and 2006, none of them played even one international match. 10% of the money from the FIFA Financial Assistance Programme (FAP) is targeted at the technical development of the game, which includes women's football, sport medicine and futsal.  This compares to 15% for men's competitions and 4% for youth football development. Between 1991 and 2010 in Mauritius, there was no FIFA FUTURO III regional course for women's coaching, no women's football seminar held in the country and no FIFA MA course held for women/youth football.

Results and fixtures

The following is a list of match results in the last 12 months, as well as any future matches that have been scheduled.

2022

2023

Coaching staff

Current coaching staff

Manager history

Players

Current squad
 The following 24 players were called up for the 2023 SAFF Women's Friendly Tournament held from 11 to 19 January 2023. 
Caps and goals correct as of 7 July 2022

Recent call-ups
The following players have been called up to a Mauritius squad in the past 12 months.

INJ Player withdrew from the squad due to an injury.
PRE Preliminary squad.
SUS Player is serving a suspension.
WD Player withdrew for personal reasons.

Previous squads
COSAFA Women's Championship
 2022 COSAFA Women's Championship squad

Records

*Active players in bold, statistics correct as of 31 August 2021.

Most capped players

Top goalscorers

Competitive record

FIFA Women's World Cup

Olympic Games

*Draws include knockout matches decided on penalty kicks.

Africa Women Cup of Nations

African Games

COSAFA Women's Championship

*Draws include knockout matches decided on penalty kicks.

See also
Sport in Mauritius
Football in Mauritius
Mauritius men's national football team

References

External links

Mauritius at the FIFA.com
 Mauritius at CAFonline.com
Mauritius Fixtures and Results – Soccerway.com

 
African women's national association football teams